A Chauka system is a method for harvesting rainwater, typically used in arid areas that are subject to monsoon rains.  Chauka comes from the Hindi word for square.
The system consists of square shaped embankments.  On three sides there are nine inch walls and one side is left open to allow rainwater to fill the structure.  As one structure fills, then the overflow fills the next chauka and so on.  Retaining the rainwater in this way helps prevent soil erosion and recharges the surface water enabling various grasses to thrive.  This has the effect of holding the soil together and, as the chauka system is used mostly on common land, provides grazing areas for cow and goat herds. For this to be effective it is combined with the planting of grass seeds and trees.

This system is widely in use in the Dudu block of Jaipur district in Rajasthan, India.  Here a local village development organisation GVNML, working in the area of Natural Resource Management, has been responsible for its uptake among local villages.

See also
Rainwater harvesting
Water conservation
Agriculture

References

Water resources management